Heiko Heßenkemper, also spelled Heiko Hessenkemper (born 11 January 1956), is a German politician (till June 2021 for the Alternative for Germany) and was member of the Bundestag from 2017 to 2021.

Life and politics

Heßenkemper was born 1956 in the West German town of Hamm and studied physics at the Clausthal University of Technology. He became a professor in 1995.

Heßenkemper entered the AfD in 2014 and became a member of the bundestag after the 2017 German federal election

Heßenkemper is considered to be part of the right-wing of the AfD.

Heßenkemper denies the scientific consensus on climate change. Heßenkemper has stated that he will not be a candidate in the 2021 German federal election. He left AfD in June 2021, three month before the 2021 federal election.

References

1956 births
People from Hamm
Members of the Bundestag for Saxony
Living people
Members of the Bundestag 2017–2021
Members of the Bundestag for the Alternative for Germany
Clausthal University of Technology alumni